Rule of Rose is a survival horror video game developed by Punchline for the PlayStation 2. Set in England in 1930, the plot revolves around a nineteen-year-old woman named Jennifer, who becomes trapped in a world ruled by young girls who have established a class hierarchy called the Red Crayon Aristocrats. It was first released in 2006 by Sony Computer Entertainment in Japan. After Sony Computer Entertainment's American and European branch did not express interest in localizing the title, it was published later that year by Atlus USA in North America and by 505 Games in Europe.

Development on Rule of Rose began after Punchline was asked by Sony Computer Entertainment to make a horror game. Punchline wanted to develop a "new type of horror game" with an emphasis on psychological horror. This decision led to the concept of childhood, specifically the "mysterious and misunderstood" nature of young girls. The team drew inspiration from the classic Brothers Grimm fairy tales for the narrative, and the Silent Hill series for graphics and art style. The entire score was produced by studio musicians in order to bring a human element to the game's atmosphere.

Rule of Rose was the subject of a moral panic in Europe prior to its publication there, based on rumors of its alleged content. These rumors ranged from erotic themes to obscene brutality. Various European authorities condemned the game and called for its banning. The game was cancelled in the United Kingdom, despite the Video Standards Council calling the complaints "nonsense". Rule of Rose received mixed reviews from many publications; reactions to the story, music, and horror elements were almost universally positive, while the gameplay was panned. The game has been compared to Silent Hill and Haunting Ground, due to the psychological horror used throughout and because the main character is accompanied by a canine companion.

Gameplay

Rule of Rose is a survival horror game in which the player guides Jennifer through exploring the game environments and advances the plot by accomplishing tasks while sporadically encountering enemies and bosses. 

Described as "essentially an interactive movie" by its director Shuji Ishikawa and associate producer Yuya Takayama, the narrative of Rule of Rose centers on the traumatic childhood memories of Jennifer, "an ordinary, vulnerable girl"; these memories sometimes manifest in exaggerated ways.

Combat is almost exclusively melee-based, with a variety of improvised weapons available, such as kitchen knives and pipes. Jennifer is a timid character: her melee attacks are neither powerful nor long-ranged. Evasion of enemies is often a more viable strategy instead of fighting. With the exception of a handful of bosses, all enemies in the game are imps—skinny, dolllike creatures the size of small children. Different animal-headed imps appear throughout the game, alongside regular imps.

Every level of the game takes place over a month. Each chapter begins with the reading of a homemade storybook related to the plot of the chapter.
During each level, Jennifer is tasked with finding a specific object that will be gifted to the Aristocracy. 

Early in the game, Jennifer encounters and rescues a dog named Brown. Brown accompanies her throughout the game and responds to the player's commands. Brown can be ordered to track items by scent, be commanded to 'stay' and be called to Jennifer's side. Brown cannot attack enemies, but will growl to distract some imps and bosses, allowing Jennifer to retreat or attack without fear of retaliation. He can be injured to the point of collapse, causing him to stop distracting enemies or track items.

Brown's ability to locate items is an integral part of the game, and is used in every chapter to progress further. The same system allows the player to find health restoratives and other items which, while not essential to complete the game, can help the player survive enemy encounters. Players select an item from the inventory for Brown to locate, which is then connected to the 'find' command until changed or removed. Every item selected this way can be used to find at least one type of item. When tracking items, Brown will lead the player through the game environments, scratching at doors in his way, signaling the player to open the door. Most health restoratives and all tradable items are hidden and must be uncovered by Brown, though the player can choose to avoid searching for these items to progress quickly. Restorative items include snack foods, candy, and chocolate. The different types of restorative items heal varying amounts of health. Bones and other items can be used to restore Brown's health if he becomes injured. Other items such as marbles and ribbons have no immediate use, but may be traded with non-playable characters in order to obtain food, rare items, and weapons.

Most levels are puzzle based. The primary puzzles require the use of Brown's scent-finding ability in order to find objects that are related to one another in order to solve a larger puzzle. Others require finding markings on the wall in order to solve the chapter's puzzle. The game is largely linear and the player cannot affect the story through their actions, although they are rewarded for exploration with secret items, additional details and combat upgrades.

Plot

During a bus ride along a rural road, 19-year-old orphan Jennifer is awakened by a mysterious young boy who presents her with an unfinished, homemade storybook and asks her to read it. The boy runs out of the bus before Jennifer can return the book to him, and she follows him to the dilapidated Rose Garden Orphanage. In the courtyard of the orphanage, Jennifer witnesses several masked children beating a bloody sack before dragging it inside.

Jennifer infiltrates the orphanage, and the boy from the bus leads Jennifer to a room in the attic where he addresses her from atop an altar and requests that Jennifer finish reading the storybook he gave her. After Jennifer finishes reading, a voice over the loudspeaker announces that a funeral is about to begin, and the boy informs Jennifer that the funeral is for her "dear friend". At the funeral, Jennifer senses something important to her buried in the grave. As she digs up the coffin, Jennifer discovers the bloody sack inside, but before she can open it the orphans of Rose Garden surround Jennifer. The voice on the loudspeaker announces that an airship will be taking off soon, and the orphans force Jennifer into the coffin, lock her inside, and carry her onto the airship.

Jennifer wakes up tied to a pole in the bowels of an impossibly large and luxurious airship. The boy who led Jennifer to the orphanage introduces himself to her as the Prince of The Red Rose. The Prince forces Jennifer to join the Red Rose Aristocracy as the lowest ranked member of the Aristocracy's extensive class hierarchy. The members of the Aristocracy are required to provide a monthly gift in order to be admitted to a ritualized club meeting in which the lower ranking members who fail to provide adequate gifts are humiliated. Failure to provide any gift at all carries the risk of being sacrificed to a being known as Stray Dog, who the club worships. 

The Prince then gives Jennifer several handmade storybooks and tells her that they will help her recover her memories, and sends her off to participate in club activities. Jennifer continuously finds herself in conflict with the Aristocrats as she attempts to fulfill their gift demands, often being blamed for incidents higher-ranked members are responsible for and subsequently punished. During her attempts to find gifts, Jennifer rescues and adopts a yellow lab who she names Brown, who continuously accompanies her. She also becomes acquainted with the two other lower-class members of the club, Amanda and Wendy. All of the incidents Jennifer becomes involved in reflect the events in the storybooks, and so Jennifer gradually remembers portions of an oath she had made.

After living for several months on the airship, Jennifer is suddenly ambushed by an adult man and taken off of the airship. She awakens on the ground in a rose garden and follows the man, Gregory M. Wilson, to his home and sneaks inside. She discovers many storybooks similar to the ones the Prince had given her, and also discovers Gregory holding a gun to his head. Jennifer enters a basement bedroom in Gregory's house and is locked inside; there she finds a stuffed bear and a series of letters between Wendy and a boy named Joshua, in which Wendy offers to help free Joshua from the basement; they address each other as "Prince" and "Princess". Suddenly, Wendy arrives at the basement window and releases Jennifer, and together they escape back to the rose garden after stealing Gregory's gun to prevent him from committing suicide. Before leaving for the airship, Wendy trades a rose-shaped brooch for Jennifer's bear, and names the bear Joshua after the unknown boy.

Back on the airship, Jennifer finds the club in a state of emergency trying to find the stuffed bear, Joshua, after it goes missing. The reward for finding the bear is a Red Crayon, an official invitation to the higher ranks of the Aristocracy. Although Wendy is originally suspected of stealing the bear by the other Aristocrats, Jennifer eventually discovers that Amanda was the thief, and Amanda apologetically returns the bear to Jennifer. Before Jennifer can return the bear, Amanda goes to the higher ranked members and blames Jennifer for stealing the bear. The Aristocrats act as though they intend to give Jennifer a red crayon, but ultimately attack her.

Jennifer awakens back in the orphanage tied to a pole, covered in red crayon markings. After being freed by Brown, she discovers all the children from the airship in a now pristine orphanage, but they all ignore or silently harass her. Jennifer ultimately learns that she has become the gift of the month. Wendy informs Jennifer of an important meeting between the Aristocrats, and subsequently disappears alongside Brown. As Jennifer searches for her friend and dog, she follows a bloody trail to the orphanage's attic, and discovers that the gift of the mouth has been changed to "Filthy Brown". Inside the attic, the Club surround the tied and bloody sack seen at the beginning. Amanda informs Jennifer that her friend is in the bag. Wendy approaches Jennifer and reveals that she is the Princess of The Red Rose, and that Brown is already dead.

Jennifer, now appearing as her child self, furiously slaps Wendy, denounces the remaining members of the Aristocrats and herself for being unable to oppose them, and throws away her rose-shaped brooch. Wendy leaves the Orphanage humiliated. 
	
Wendy is finally deposed as the Princess after it's discovered that Stray Dog was a lie in order to control the Aristocrats, based on Gregory Wilson and newspapers about a serial killer. Wendy disappears entirely, and without a leader, the orphans began violently fighting with each other, which causes the orphan's adult caretakers to mysteriously disappear. The Aristocrats approach Jennifer in the hope that she would replace Wendy as their leader and bring order back to the club, but before Jennifer can decline the offer, the girls notice Wendy approaching the orphanage and leave to go turn her away. Shortly afterward Jennifer hears screaming from outside, and discovers the Prince leading a monster appearing to be Stray Dog. The Prince approaches Jennifer and reveals that he is actually Wendy in disguise. Unknown to the orphans, Wendy had gone to live with Gregory by disguising herself as his son Joshua, and used the disguise to torture Gregory into becoming Stray Dog. She then ordered him to kill all of the Aristocrats out of revenge. After the massacre of the orphans, Wendy regretfully confesses that she had Brown killed out of jealousy. Wendy pleads with Jennifer to stop Gregory, and gives Jennifer the stolen gun. In a moment of lucidity Gregory then asks 'Joshua' to give him back his gun, and Gregory shoots himself with it.

In the final chapter, Jennifer re-appears in the orphanage as a child and is able to explore freely without any enemies or objectives. All of the events up until this point were merely Jennifer's disordered and warped recollections of her childhood in the orphanage. She discovers the letters received by Wendy from Gregory's basement, revealing that Jennifer was the original "Joshua" who was kidnapped and trapped in the basement by Gregory as a replacement for his deceased son, and saved by Wendy. Wendy brought Jennifer to the orphanage for companionship and together they swore an oath togethe:  "Everlasting True Love, I Am Yours". The two girls exchanged Jennifer's stuffed bear for Wendy's rose-shaped brooch as promises of loyalty to each other, and Wendy really named the bear Joshua after Jennifer's former identity. Wendy formed the Red Crayon Aristocrats from the children at the orphanage, and the children would pretend together that the orphanage was an airship as a means of escapism from their regular lives.  After adopting Brown, Jennifer had begun to neglect Wendy, and believing that she had forgotten the oath she made, Wendy demoted Jennifer from the position of Prince and replaced her with the stuffed bear Joshua as a figurehead. Wendy also ordered the other Aristocrats to bully and ignore Jennifer in the hopes that she would remember her promise of loyalty to Wendy, and beg to return to her side. When this didn't work and Jennifer remained at the bottom of the caste with Brown, Wendy had Brown killed to try and force her into submission.

Jennifer also recalls that she was taken from the orphanage after the massacre by the police after being the only survivor. After she was also found to be a survivor of an earlier airship crash that resulted in the deaths of her parents and her kidnapping, her story was given media prominence and the news of the orphanage massacre was buried, leaving the children unremembered.

Finally, Jennifer leaves the orphanage and finds Brown in a shed nearby. She puts a collar with his name around Brown's neck, promising to protect him and her memories for eternity. She writes the oath she made to Wendy on a chalkboard and leaves it in the shed after chaining Brown's collar to a pillar, then closes the shed's door on Brown, symbolically locking his memory deep inside herself.

Development

The company Punchline, which had previously developed the video game Chulip, developed Rule of Rose for the PlayStation 2. A group of twenty-five developers, Punchline began the project after being asked by Sony Computer Entertainment to develop a horror video game; not wanting to create a game similar to the survival-horror series Resident Evil, Punchline decided on the goal of developing a "new type of horror game, one which wasn’t the usual zombie, ghost and slasher type," with an emphasis on psychological horror rather than "surprise- and shock-based horror." A proposed early draft by Yoshiro Kimura was a dark fantasy "boy's story" that centered on a boy abducted by "a big man" and his attempts to escape, while encountering the ghosts of previous victims. Keywords included "Kidnapping, imprisonment, children, bullying, dwarfs, airship, escape." This concept was turned down by the publisher on the basis of being "too dangerous a topic," and Kimura turned to the idea of examining the "fear between girls."

This decision led to the concept of "a game surrounding childhood and children," but from both viewpoints to show how children and adults can find the other one terrifying, with  a primary focus on the adult's perspective. Though the game has garnered comparisons with William Golding's 1954 allegorical novel Lord of the Flies, the developers did not draw inspiration from it, instead focusing on the "mysterious and misunderstood" nature of girls. The story formed through trial and error as the developers figured out how to create a sense of fear, ultimately adding the children's secret society, the Red Crayon Aristocrats. They also included Brown as a way to balance Jennifer's "helpless and unhappy" personality and make the game more enjoyable. Because of budget and time problems, the combat system was left a little rough.

Rule of Roses graphics are heavily stylized, incorporating a series of visual filters similar to those used in the Silent Hill series. The developers researched the behavior of children, monitoring a group of European and American children, and photographed references for "the game’s textures and models"; for the motion capture, the team had Japanese children act. At the request of the developers, the group of children also expressed through drawings or written words what caused them to be happy or afraid. The company Shirogumi worked on the computer-generated imagery present in Rule of Roses cutscenes. The musical score was composed by Yutaka Minobe, who also co-composed the music of Skies of Arcadia and some tracks from the Panzer Dragoon Orta soundtrack. The entire score was produced by studio musicians, including the Hiroshi Murayama Trio, and vocals by Kaori Kondo. According to the game's developers, the music was intended to bring a human element to the atmosphere in the game. A 6-track promotional soundtrack CD was produced by Atlus, which was issued to customers from certain retailers when Rule of Rose was pre-ordered.

Punchline included several themes in Rule of Rose, with the primary one being "intimate relationships between all people". A major theme in the game is the difference between a child's and an adult's way of thinking, and how children might treat adults if they were given power over them. Players are helpless to prevent their adult player character from being bullied by the children. Another theme is how attachment "to one thing can bring out the worst in people."

Controversy
Prior to its publication, Rule of Rose was the subject of a moral panic in Europe. At E3 2006 Atlus announced that it would be releasing Rule of Rose in the United States, following Sony's decision to pass on an American release, as the game "wasn’t really in sync with their corporate image" and the company had wanted the game to "be a bit tamer, if it were to have the Sony name in the U.S." The developers disagreed with this, saying that "the theme is supposed to be one of intimate familiarity" and that they had intended to portray how children behave "without the filter of guilt or sin." Rumors of violence towards children in the game tied into a larger discussion of morality and violence in video games appeared in the Italian magazine Panorama in November 2006, and were quickly picked up by the British media, which alleged that the game had scenes of "children buried alive underground, in-game sadomasochism, and underage eroticism." These allegations were untrue. At the time, Rule of Rose had already been rated by various video game advisory boards as suitable for an older teenage audience: in Japan, it was rated 15+; in the majority of Europe, 16+; and in North America, 17+.

European Union justice minister Franco Frattini attacked the game as containing "obscene cruelty and brutality." He also called for changes to the PEGI rating system in place across Europe and for government officials to engage in discussions with industry representatives. Frattini received a letter from Viviane Reding, commissioner for the information society and media, who criticized his actions: "It is...very unfortunate that my services were not pre-consulted before your letter to the Ministers of Interior was sent out," reminding him of the commission-backed self-regulating ratings system called PEGI that has operated across the European Union since 2003. The PEGI system of classification, according to Reding's letter, offers "informed adult choice" without censoring content: "This is in line with the Commission's view that measures taken to protect minors and human dignity must be carefully balanced with the fundamental right to freedom of expression as laid down in the Charter on Fundamental Rights of the European Union." On March 7, 2007, a group of Member of the European Parliaments presented a Motion for a European Parliament resolution on a ban on the sale and distribution in Europe of the game and the creation of a 'European Observatory on childhood and minors'. The game was further suggested to be banned for sale in France, and to be kept from the public in Poland. At this time, the game had not yet been released in Europe; the public officials suggesting that Rule of Rose be banned had not played the game, only having read about its alleged content or seen the trailer.

505 Games' Australian distributor, Red-Ant, cancelled the game's Australian and New Zealand release, and 505 Games later cancelled the United Kingdom release as a result of complaints by Frattini and other EU officials, and "largely misleading" commentary from the British press, although review copies had already shipped to video game journalists. It was released in the rest of Europe. The British body which had granted the title its 16+ PEGI rating (the Video Standards Council) responded to the press and Frattini's comments: "I have no idea where the suggestion of in-game sadomasochism has come from, nor children being buried underground. These are things that have been completely made up. [...] We're not worried about our integrity being called into question, because Mr Frattini's quotes are nonsense." The Council further noted that "there isn't any underage eroticism. And the most violent scene does indeed see one of the young girls scare Jennifer with a rat on a stick. But the rat's actually quite placid towards her and even licks her face."

Reception

The game received mixed reviews, according to video game review aggregator Metacritic. The reviewer for video game magazine Play wrote: "I think everyone should experience this game, especially horror fans, but in order to do so, you're going to have to suffer through times of sheer agony—just like poor, unlucky Jennifer." According to Official UK PlayStation 2 Magazine, the game "[b]lends the stuff of nightmares with stylish sound and graphics. Sadly, the developer should have spent longer on the gameplay." Edge found neither plot nor gameplay appealing: "It’s just a murky brew of meaningless, exploitative dysfunction filling an empty game, and it leaves a bitter taste."

It is generally agreed that the title has an interesting plot, with The A.V. Club observing that "aside from a few deep curtsies and an unlockable Gothic Lolita costume, the characters are more sinister than sexualised". However, the gameplay is widely lambasted as clumsy, archaic, and unrewarding. The press was generally divided upon how much the gameplay detracts from one's ability to enjoy the story itself. GamesRadar described Jennifer as "a cringing, passive non-entity" and stated: "There's no denying that Rule of Rose is extremely pretty, atmospheric and disturbing.... but as an adventure game, Rule of Rose just sort of wilts." Acegamez, on the other hand, not only admired the game's plot but also found the gameplay appealing if slow, "a wonderful psychological thriller that will draw you in with its bizarrely compelling narrative, atmospheric presentation and thoughtful story-based gameplay".

In a retrospective article on survival horror games, GamePro's Michael Cherdchupan listed Rule of Rose as one of the classics of the genre, writing that the game was a work of art that lingered long after playing through; he praised it for its delicate handling of its subject matter and Jennifer's journey as she processes her trauma. IGN listed Rule of Rose as one of the worst horror games created after 2000. While enjoying the "refreshingly adult take on sexual awakening and repressed memories that's consistently unsettling without ever resorting to cheap shock tactics," it criticized the game's "totally broken" combat and "thoroughly excruciating" backtracking, controls, and camera angles.

Because of the limited number of copies published, Rule of Rose has garnered a reputation as one of the more expensive video games to buy second-hand.

Future
In 2021, Tokyo indie game developer Onion Games expressed interest in remastering Rule of Rose. Although they "can't guarantee that any of these initiatives will have more than a 1% chance of happening", they would like to give it a try after remastering a previous title for the Nintendo Switch called Moon.

Notes

References

External links
 

2006 video games
505 Games games
Atlus games
Censored video games
Single-player video games
LGBT-related video games
Obscenity controversies in video games
PlayStation 2 games
PlayStation 2-only games
2000s horror video games
Psychological horror games
Sony Interactive Entertainment games
Survival video games
Video game controversies
Video games about dogs
Video games developed in Japan
Video games featuring female protagonists
Video games set in England
Video games set in the 1930s